Russia–Ukraine barrier, also known as Ukrainian Wall or European Wall, or as Project Wall in Ukraine is a fortified border barrier by Ukraine on the Russia–Ukraine border. The aim of the project, according to Ukraine, is preventing Russian military intervention in Ukraine and to assist with obtaining visa-free travel with the European Union. The former Prime Minister of Ukraine Arseniy Yatsenyuk presented this project on 3 September 2014, building started officially in 2015, and in June 2020, the State Border Guard of Ukraine expected that the project would be finished by 2025.

On 24 February 2022 the construction of the barrier was suspended when Russia invaded Ukraine.

History

Following the 2014 Russian military intervention in Ukraine, in June 2014, Ukrainian politician and business magnate Ihor Kolomoyskyi suggested that Ukraine should build a wall along the border with Russia. On 3 September 2014, Ukrainian Prime Minister Arseniy Yatsenyuk announced Ukraine would strengthen its border with Russia and called this "Project Wall". The command of Ukraine's anti-terrorist forces stated that "Two defense lines have been planned, and their main goal is to prevent the infiltration by the adversary into the territory of Ukraine". According to Yatsenyuk the project was needed "to cut off Russian support for insurgents in eastern regions" and also to obtain a visa-free regime with the European Union for Ukraine. It is also an employment project. Project "Wall" was officially started on 10 September 2014.

On September 12, 2014, The Cabinet of Ministers of Ukraine allocated 100 million hryvnia for the construction of fortifications on the border with Russia and on the border with Crimea. On 18 March 2015, the Ukrainian government allocated 865 million hryvnia to build fortifications on the border between Ukraine and Russia. On 10 April 2015, Poland allocated a loan of $100 million for the modernization of the energy sector and improvement of external borders of Ukraine.

As of May 2015, a walled defense system was under construction along the Russian border in Kharkiv Oblast. The project was planned to be finished in 2018.

On 20 August 2015, it was announced that Ukraine has completed 10% of the fortification line, stating that roughly 180 km of anti-tank ditches had been dug, 40 km of barbed wire fence and 500 fortification obstacles had been erected. 139 million hryvnia out of 300 million allocated has been used for construction of the wall at this point, and that another 460 million hryvnia were budgeted for 2016.

In August 2017, it became public that large amounts of the money intended to pay for the Wall project were misused and even stolen. The National Anti-Corruption Bureau (NABU) announced the arrest of several individuals involved in the building of the fortified border.

On 5 June 2020, the State Border Guard Service of Ukraine stated that the Wall project was 40% implemented as of the end of May 2020. Since 2015, $63.6 million had been spent on the project which the Border Guard Service expected to be finished by 2025.

Head of the State Border Guard Service of Ukraine Serhiy Deyneko stated on 5 May 2021 that Ukraine had built 400 km of anti-tank trench, 100 km of fence and 70 km of barbed wire as part of "Project Wall". According to him, border guards were completing work on the border in Kharkiv Oblast, part of the work was performed in Chernihiv Oblast, one site was completed in Luhansk Oblast, and in Sumy Oblast so far only design and survey works were underway.

On 24 February 2022, the construction of the barrier was temporarily stopped when Russia invaded Ukraine.

See also 

 2022 Russian invasion of Ukraine
 Russia–Ukraine border
 Russo-Ukrainian War
 Russia–Ukraine relations
 Ukraine–European Union relations

References 

Russia–Ukraine border
Fortification lines
Engineering projects
Buildings and structures under construction in Ukraine
Buildings and structures in Chernihiv Oblast
Buildings and structures in Kharkiv Oblast
Border barriers
Corruption in Ukraine